This is a list of schools in Derby, in the English county of Derbyshire.

State-funded schools

Primary schools

 Akaal Primary school
 Allenton Primary School
 Alvaston Infant School
 Alvaston Junior Academy
 Arboretum Primary School
 Ash Croft Primary Academy 
 Ashgate Primary School
 Ashwood Spencer Academy
 Asterdale Primary School
 Beaufort Community Primary School
 Becket Primary School
 The Bemrose School
 Bishop Lonsdale CE Primary School
 Borrow Wood Primary School
 Brackensdale Spencer Academy
 Breadsall Hill Top Primary School
 Brookfield Primary School
 Carlyle Infant Academy
 Castleward Spencer Academy
 Cavendish Close Infant School
 Cavendish Close Junior Academy
 Chaddesden Park Primary School
 Chellaston Infant School
 Chellaston Junior School
 Cherry Tree Hill Primary School
 Cottons Farm Primary Academy
 Dale Community Primary School
 Derby St Chad's CE Infant School
 Derwent Primary School
 Firs Primary School
 Gayton Junior School
 Grampian Primary Academy
 Griffe Field Primary School
 Hackwood Primary Academy
 Hardwick Primary School
 Homefields Primary School
 Lakeside Primary Academy
 Landau Forte Academy Moorhead
 Lawn Primary School
 Markeaton Primary School
 Meadow Farm Community Primary School
 Mickleover Primary School
 Oakwood Infant School
 Oakwood Junior School
 Parkview Primary School
 Pear Tree Community Junior School
 Pear Tree Infant School
 Portway Infant School
 Portway Junior School
 Ravensdale Infant School
 Ravensdale Junior School
 Redwood Primary School
 Reigate Park Primary Academy
 Ridgeway Infant School
 Roe Farm Primary School
 Rosehill Infant School
 St Alban's RC Academy
 St George's RC Academy
 St James' CE Infant School
 St James' CE Junior School
 St John Fisher RC Academy
 St Joseph's RC Academy
 St Mary's RC Academy
 St Peter's CE Junior School
 St Werburgh's CE Primary School
 Shelton Infant School
 Shelton Junior School
 Silverhill Primary School
 Springfield Primary School
 Village Primary Academy
 Walter Evans CE Primary School
 Wren Park Primary School
 Wyndham Primary Academy
 Zaytouna Primary School

Secondary schools

 Allestree Woodlands School
 Alvaston Moor Academy
 The Bemrose School
 Chellaston Academy
 City of Derby Academy
 Da Vinci Academy
 Derby Cathedral School
 Derby Moor Academy
 Landau Forte College
 Lees Brook Community School
 Littleover Community School
 Murray Park School
 Noel-Baker Academy
 Saint Benedict Catholic Voluntary Academy
 UTC Derby Pride Park
 West Park School

Special and alternative schools

 Derby Pride Academy
 Ivy House School
 Kingsmead School
 Newton's Walk
 St Andrew's Academy
 St Clare's School
 St Giles' School
 St Martin's School

Further education
 Buxton & Leek College
 Derby College

Independent schools

Primary and preparatory schools
Emmanuel School

Senior and all-through schools
 Derby Grammar School
 Derby High School 
Normanton House School
Old Vicarage School

Special and alternative schools
Jasmine Hall School
Maple View School
Royal School for the Deaf Derby
Spring Valley School

References

Derby
Schools in Derby